Joseph Francis Flannelly (October 22, 1894—May 23, 1973) was an American clergyman of the Roman Catholic Church. He served as an auxiliary bishop of the Archdiocese of New York from 1948 to 1969.

Biography
Joseph Flannelly was born in New York City to Michael J. and Mary A. (née Considine) Flannelly. He attended Cathedral College in his native city, and made his theological studies at St. Joseph's Seminary in Yonkers. He was ordained to the priesthood on September 1, 1918. His first assignment was as a curate at Our Lady of the Rosary Church in Yonkers. He there supervised the parochial school, taught singing, and organized and coached the school baseball and basketball teams. He also served as chaplain of the local fire department.

In 1938, he was transferred to St. Patrick's Cathedral in New York City, serving as an assistant to Monsignor Michael J. Lavelle. The following year he succeeded Lavelle as administrator of St. Patrick's Cathedral, a post in which he remained until his retirement in 1969. Under Flannelly's guidance, St. Patrick's underwent extensive changes; these changes included the installation of a new altar and a rose window in the west wall of the edifice, major improvements of the organ, and the completion of five sculptured bronze doors facing Fifth Avenue. He became a papal chamberlain in 1941, and was raised to the rank of domestic prelate in 1943. In August 1948, he celebrated the Requiem Mass for the late Babe Ruth.

On November 9, 1948, Flannelly was appointed Auxiliary bishop of New York and Titular Bishop of Metelis by Pope Pius XII. After receiving news of his appointment, he stated, "I am delighted, of course, that I am going to be a successor of the Apostles, and I am humbly grateful to God." He received his episcopal consecration on the following December 16 from Cardinal Francis Spellman, with Bishops Joseph Patrick Donahue and Stephen Joseph Donahue serving as co-consecrators, at St. Patrick's Cathedral. At his consecration, he wore the same vestments worn by Cardinal Spellman and Pope Pius XII at their own consecrations. He was also given the episcopal ring of Cardinal Patrick Joseph Hayes and the pectoral cross of Archbishop John Hughes. He selected as his episcopal motto: "Pro Hominibus ad Deum," which, freely translated, means, "Ordained for men in the things that appertain to God".

In 1950, Flannelly issued an admonition to be read at each of the seven Sunday Masses in St. Patrick's Cathedral: "We note with alarm and regret the growing custom of holding parties in business offices on the days immediately preceding Christmas. We caution the faithful against such parties for the following reasons: 1) these parties ignore the sacred character of Advent, which is a time of becoming preparation for the coming of our divine Savior; 2) the days immediately preceding Christmas are invariably days of fast and abstinence...3) at many of these parties there is excessive use of intoxicating drinks. These sinful excesses cause untold harm in various ways to the participants and their families. They corrupt the morals and lower the morale of the community and the nation." He was an ardent proponent of the restoration of religion to the public school system, and was once quoted as having said that "in the face of Communist activities bent on taking God out of government and business, the most important first thing we have to do is put religion back in education."

After reaching the mandatory retirement age of 75, Flannelly resigned as Auxiliary Bishop of New York on November 8, 1969. He later died at St. Clare's Hospital, aged 78.

References

1894 births
1973 deaths
Clergy from New York City
Participants in the Second Vatican Council
20th-century American Roman Catholic titular bishops
Saint Joseph's Seminary (Dunwoodie) alumni
Burials at St. Patrick's Cathedral (Manhattan)